Doug Corella is a rock drummer and keyboardist who has played in various bands during the 1990s and 2000s.

Career
Doug was a member of The Verve Pipe and is a member of the band duo The Karlz (written the karlz) with guitarist Todd Bowie.

Notes

Doug Corella attended Central Michigan University in Mt. Pleasant, MI. He studied with Robert Hohner and performed with the Robert Hohner Percussion Ensemble. He taught at Rowe Clark Math and Science Academy as the Music Teacher. Rowe Clark is a branch of the highly recommended Noble Street Charter Schools. He then was the entertainment manager at the Four Winds Casino.

External links
the karlz
Wiki Music Guide

Alternative rock drummers
Alternative rock keyboardists
American alternative rock musicians
American rock drummers
American rock keyboardists
Musicians from Michigan
The Verve Pipe members
Living people
Year of birth missing (living people)